Homoeocera toulgoeti is a moth of the subfamily Arctiinae first described by Xavier Lesieur in 1984. It is found in Ecuador.

References

Euchromiina
Moths described in 1984